Holstebro Håndbold is a women's handball club in the Bambusa Kvindeligaen from Holstebro, Denmark. Their home matches are played in Gråkjær Arena.

History 
Previously, the women's team was part of TTH Holstebro. TTH decided to split up the men's and women's section in each club, due to the COVID-19 pandemic. HH90 took over the women's section and the men's stayed in TTH Holstebro.

The new club name Holstebro Håndbold, was announced on 14 April 2020.

Results

TTH Holstebro 
Danish Women's Handball League:
Silver Medalist: 2013
Bronze Medalist: 2015, 2016
Women's EHF Cup: 2
Winner: 2013, 2015
Silver Medalist: 2011
Women's EHF Cup Winners' Cup: 1
Winner: 2016

Kits

Team

Current squad
Squad for the 2022–23 season

 
Goalkeepers
 1  Jesse van de Polder
 12  Emilie Holst Firgaard
Wingers
LW
 19  Julie Bjerregaard
 21  Maja Edling Lauritsen 
RW
 18  Berta Rut Hardardottir
 33  Josefine Jensen
Line players
 3  Nanna Løvig Rasmussen
 8  Camilla Vinding Pedersen  
 55  Kim Hinkelmann

Back players
LB
 6  Anne-Louise Moesgaard
 9  Mathilde Høy Troelsen 
 13  Elin Karlsson
CB
 4  Evi Jaspers
 5  Tea Thomassen Hein
 44  Rikke Aastrup Nielsen 
RB
 10  Mathilde Hylleberg

Technical staff
  Head coach: Pether Krautmeyer
  Assistant coach: Michael Rasmussen
  Goal keeper coach Sara Kececi 
  Physiotherapist: Morten Vanggaard
  Physiotherapist: Sofie Brøndgaard
  Team Leader: Lotte Myre 
  Team Leader: Dorthe Pilgaard

Transfers
Transfers for the season 2022-23

Joining
  Jesse van de Polder (GK) (from   Vendsyssel Håndbold)
  Emilie Holst Firgaard (GK) (from  Aarhus United) 
  Elin Karlsson (LB) (from  Kärra HF)
  Anne-Louise Moesgaard (LB) (from  Rødovre HK)
  Evi Jaspers (CB) (from  Vlug en Lenig)
  Mathilde Hylleberg (RB/RW) (comeback)
  Berta Rut Hardardottir (RW/RB) (on loan from  Haukar Handball)
  Kim Hinkelmann (P) (from  TSV Bayer 04 Leverkusen)

  Rikke Aastrup Nielsen (CB) (from own rows)
  Josefine Jensen (RW) (from own rows)

Leaving
  Sara Kececi (Goal keeper coach)
  Anne Christine Bossen (GK) (to  Randers HK)
  Sophie Amalie Moth (GK) (to  Borussia Dortmund Handball)
  Emille Bastrup Berthelsen (LW) (to  Silkeborg-Voel KFUM)
  Andrea West Bendtsen (LB) (to  Silkeborg-Voel KFUM)
  Isabella Jacobsen (LB) (to  Rælingen_HK)
  Jenny Carlson (CB) (to  Brest Bretagne Handball)
  Camilla Pytlick (CB)
  Lærke Christensen (RB)
  Emma Laursen (RB) (to  Ringkøbing Håndbold)
  Julie Holm (RB) (to  Ringkøbing Håndbold)
  Sofie Brems Østergaard (RW) (to  Ringkøbing Håndbold)
  Melina Kristensen (RW) (to  Skanderborg Håndbold)
  Julie Gantzel Pedersen (P) (to  Herning-Ikast Håndbold)
  Josefine Dragenberg (P) (to  SønderjyskE Håndbold)
  Hanne Trangeled Nielsen (P) (Retires)

References 

Danish handball clubs
Holstebro Municipality
Handball clubs established in 2020
2020 establishments in Denmark